The South West African Class Hb 0-6-2T of 1905 was a narrow gauge steam locomotive from the German South West Africa era.

Between 1905 and 1908, the German Administration in German South West Africa acquired fifteen Class Hb  locomotives for lease to the Otavi Mining and Railway Company. Six of these locomotives survived to be taken onto the roster of the South African Railways after the First World War.

Manufacturer
By 1905, the rapid progress with the construction of the Otavi Railway called for heavier and more powerful locomotives. Between 1905 and 1908, fifteen  narrow gauge  tank and tank-and-tender steam locomotives were built for the German Administration in German South West Africa (GSWA) by Henschel and Son in Germany. They were designated Class Hb and numbered in the range from 51 to 65.

The locomotives were leased to the Otavi Mining and Railway Company, who operated the narrow gauge Otavi Railway which was being constructed across the Namib Desert between Swakopmund and Tsumeb, to augment their mainline locomotive fleet.

Characteristics
The locomotives used Allan valve gear and were equipped with dust covers to protect the motion from wind-blown sand in the Namib Desert. The "Hb" classification identified the locomotive type as the second class to have been built for GSWA by Henschel. They were delivered in four batches.
 The first three tank locomotives were delivered in 1905, with works numbers in the range from 7298 to 7300 and numbered in the range from 51 to 53.
 Four more followed in 1906, with works numbers in the range from 7623 to 7626 and numbered in the range from 54 to 57.
 Two arrived in 1907, with works numbers 8610 and 8611 and numbered 64 and 65.
 Six were delivered in 1908, with works numbers in the range from 7740 to 7745 and numbered in the range from 58 to 63. These last six locomotives were delivered as tank-and-tender engines, equipped with optional coal and water tenders.

Service
Photographic evidence show that some of these locomotives were eventually permanently converted to tender engines by removing their side tanks.

During the First World War, the former German Colony came under South African administration and the railways in GSWA came under control of the Union Defence Forces. Control of all railway operations in South West Africa (SWA) was passed on from the Military to the Director of Railways in Windhoek on 1 August 1915. On 1 April 1922, all the railway lines and rolling stock in the territory became part of the South African Railways.

Six of these locomotives, numbers 51, 54, 56, 61, 62 and 65, survived into the SAR era. They retained their German Colonial Hb classification and engine numbers while in SAR service. All but one were scrapped after they were withdrawn from service in 1942. Engine no. 56 has been preserved, coupled to a short period train at the Alte Feste museum in Windhoek.

Illustration
In the main picture, engine no. 61 is shown with its side tanks still intact and with an optional coal and water tender.

References

0920
0-6-2 locomotives
C1 locomotives
Henschel locomotives
600 mm gauge railway locomotives
Railway locomotives introduced in 1905
1922 in South Africa
Scrapped locomotives